Safa Merve Nalçacı (born 28 July 1993) is a Turkish women's football defender currently playing in the Turkish Women's First Football League for Fenerbahçe S.K. in Istanbul with jersey number 2. She was part of the Turkey women's national team.

Private life
Safa Merve Nalçcacı was born in Van, eastern Turkey on 	28 July 1993.

Playing career

Club

Nalçacı obtained her license from Karşıyaka BESEM Spor in Izmir on 16 November 2007. She then played in the team between 2008 and 2012. During this time, she appeared the |Women's Regional and |Second League, scoring 15 goals in 33 matches. In the |2012–13 season, she transferred to the Istanbul-based club Çamlıcaspor to play in the |Women's First League. After playing 18 matches, she moved to Karşıyaka Koleji Spor in İzmit in the second half of the 2013–14 Second League season. The next season, she joined the new established team Beşiktaş J.K. in Istanbul, which played in the |Third League. At the end of that season, she enjoyed her team's promotion to the Second League, and after one season to the First League. She capped in 58 matches and scored two goals in three seasons with Beşiktaş J.K. For the 2017–18 First League season, she went to the newly promoted Fatih Vatan Spor, where she played 17 matches.

In July 2018, Nalçacı joined the league champion Ataşehir Belediyespor before the 2018–19 UEFA Women's Champions League qualifying round. She played in all three matches of the qualifying round. In October 2018, she returned to Fatih Vatan Spor for the 2018–19 Women's First League season. The next season, she moved to Kireçburnu Spor

International
Nalçacı was admitted to the Turkey women's national football team, debuting in the UEFA Women's Euro 2017 qualifying Group 5 match against Russia on 2 June 2016.

Career statistics
.

Honours
Turkish Women's First Football League
 Beşiktaş J.K.
 Runners-up (1): 2016–17

Turkish Women's Second Football League
 Beşiktaş J.K.
 Winners (1): 2015–16

Turkish Women's Third Football League
 Beşiktaş J.K.
 Winners (1): 2014–15

Turkish Women's Regional Football League
 Karşıyaka BESEM Spor
 Runners-up (2): 2009–10, 2010–11

References

Living people
1993 births
Sportspeople from Van, Turkey
Women's association football defenders
Turkey women's international footballers
Turkish women's footballers
Karşıyaka BESEM Spor players
Beşiktaş J.K. women's football players
Fatih Vatan Spor players
Fenerbahçe S.K. women's football players
Ataşehir Belediyespor players
Kireçburnu Spor players
Turkish Women's Football Super League players
20th-century Turkish sportswomen
21st-century Turkish sportswomen